Andreasen and the parallel form Andresen (Norwegian cognate Andreassen) are Danish-Norwegian patronymic surnames meaning "son of Andreas". It has a similar origin as the name Andersen. It may refer to:

 Christian Andreasen (born 1988), Danish footballer
 Dagmar Andreasen (1920–2006), Danish businesswoman and politician
 Emil Andreasen (1895–1972), Danish boxer
 Frank Andreasen (born 1975), Danish darts player
 George Andreasen (1934-1989), American orthodontist
 Heidi Andreasen (born 1985), Faroese paralympic swimming silver medalist
 Jakob Andreasen (born 1976), Danish handball coach
 Lawrence Andreasen (1945-1990), American athlete
 Leon Andreasen (born 1983), Danish footballer
 Marta Andreasen (born 1954), Argentina-born member of the European Parliament
 Nancy Coover Andreasen (born 1938), American neuroscientist
 Rannvá Andreasen (born 1980), Faroese association footballer  
 Søren Andreasen (born 1996), Danish footballer
 Lindsey Andreasen (born 1992), American Nuclear Scientist

See also 
 Andresen
 Andersen
 Andreessen (disambiguation)
 Andriessen
 Andreassen
 Andreasson

References 

Danish-language surnames
Norwegian-language surnames
Patronymic surnames
Surnames from given names